The World Figure Skating Championships is an annual figure skating competition sanctioned by the International Skating Union in which figure skaters compete for the title of World Champion.

The 1963 competitions for men's singles, ladies' singles, pair skating, and ice dance took place from February 28 to March 3 in Cortina d'Ampezzo, Italy. The competition was held in the open-air ice stadium, with events running as late as 1 or 2am, by which time it was very cold. This caused the ice to become hard and brittle, as well as causing discomfort to those in attendance.

Perhaps due to the poor ice conditions, the men's competition was marred by many falls. Both the winner Donald McPherson and second-place finisher Alain Calmat fell on triple loop attempts, but neither Manfred Schnelldorfer nor Karol Divín, who had been placed 1-2 after the compulsory figures, performed well in the free skating.

Marika Kilius and Hans-Jürgen Bäumler won the pair competition, although some questioned whether some of their lifts, including a "triple Axel lift" (an Axel lasso lift with 3.5 rotations), were legal under the ISU rules of the time. The Canadian team of Debbi Wilkes and Guy Revell had to withdraw after Wilkes suffered a head injury in a fall while posing for press photos.

Disaster also struck the American dance team Yvonne Littlefield and Peter Betts. They placed 9th in the compulsory dances, but in the free dance Betts's blade came unscrewed from the boot and they were unable to finish their program. Meanwhile, the defending champions Eva Romanová and Pavel Roman came from behind to retain title after being defeated in the compulsory dances by the British team, Linda Shearman and Michael Phillips, who had also defeated the Romans at the European Championships earlier that year.

Defending champion Sjoukje Dijkstra also retained her title, building a big lead in the compulsory figures and following it with a good performance in the free skate, in which she now included a double Lutz for the first time. Nicole Hassler, second in the free skate and third overall, had two strong double Axels at the end of her program.
The Japanese competitor Miwa Fukuhara, who finished 6th overall, included a triple salchow in her program.

Results

Men

Judges:
 E. Kucharz 
 J. A. McKechnie 
 Zdeněk Fikar 
 N. Valdes 
 Adolf Walker 
 Pamela Peat 
 Giovanni DeMori 
 C. Benedict-Stieber 
 John R. Shoemaker

Ladies

Judges:
 Oskar Madl 
 E. R. S. McLauchlin 
 Emil Skákala 
 Gérard Rodrigues-Henriques 
 Theo Klemm 
 C. Benedict-Stieber 
 W. Fritz 
 L. B. Sanderson 
 Sergei Vasiliev

Pairs

Judges:
 W. Malek 
 E. R. S. McLauchlin 
 Zdeněk Fikar 
 N. Valdes 
 János Zsigmondy 
 Elemér Terták 
 W. Fritz 
 L. B. Sanderson 
 Sergei Vasiliev

Ice dance

Judges:
 Hans Meixner 
 J. A. McKechnie 
 Emil Skákala 
 Claude Lambert 
 H. Wollersen 
 Mollie Phillips 
 Elemér Terták 
 C. Bernacchi 
 John R. Shoemaker

References

Sources
 Result List provided by the ISU

World Figure Skating Championships
World Figure Skating Championships
Sport in Cortina d'Ampezzo
International figure skating competitions hosted by Italy
February 1963 sports events in Europe
March 1963 sports events in Europe